Tischeria sparmanniae is a moth of the family Tischeriidae. It is known from South Africa, Zimbabwe and Namibia.

The larvae feed on Sparmannia ricinocarpa. They probably mine the leaves of their host plant.

References

Tischeriidae
Lepidoptera of Namibia
Lepidoptera of South Africa
Lepidoptera of Zimbabwe
Moths of Sub-Saharan Africa
Moths described in 2003